Chrysauge unicolor is a species of snout moth in the genus Chrysauge. It was described by Carlos Berg in 1876 and is found in Argentina and Venezuela.

References

Moths described in 1876
Chrysauginae